Frank Sherwood Taylor (1897 – 5 January 1956) was a British historian of science, museum curator, and chemist who was Director of the Science Museum in London, England.

F. Sherwood Taylor was educated at Sherborne School in Dorset, southern England and Lincoln College, Oxford. He then undertook a PhD at University College, London in the new Department of History and Method of Science.

He spent a period as a schoolmaster and then as a lecturer in chemistry at Queen Mary College, London. 
He was a founder member of the Philosophy of Science Group. He was also the founder editor of the Ambix journal, started in 1937, and the journal of the Society for the History of Alchemy and Chemistry
In 1940, he succeeded Robert Gunther as Curator of the Museum of the History of Science in Oxford.
Towards the end of his life, he was Director of the Science Museum from 1950 until his death in 1956. During this time, he delivered the 1952 Royal Institution Christmas Lectures in London on How Science has Grown. He was President of the British Society for the History of Science from 1951 to 1953.

The Young Chemist and Sydney Brenner
In an interview conducted by Errol Friedberg, Sydney Brenner said:

Books 
F. Sherwood Taylor wrote many books on the history of alchemy and chemistry in particular, and also of science in general:

 Inorganic and Theoretical Chemistry (1931); 5th edition (1939)
 Organic Chemistry (1933)
 A Short Organic Chemistry (1933)
 The Young Chemist (1934, new edition 1961). Practical Books, Thomas Nelson and Sons, Edinburgh.
 The World of Science (1936); 1064 pages
 Galileo and the Freedom of Thought (1938)
 General Science for Schools: Parts 1–3 (1939)
 The March of Mind: A Short History of Science (1939)
 A Short History of Science and Scientific Thought, with readings from the great scientists from the Babylonians to Einstein (1940)
 The Century of Science (1941)
 The Conquest of Bacteria, from Salvarsan to Sulphapyridine (1942)
 Science, Past and Present (1945)
 The Fourfold Vision: a study of the relations of science and religion (1946)
 Two Ways of Life - Christian and Materialist (1947)
 A Century of British Chemistry (Science in Britain) (1947)
 Man's Conquest of Nature (1948)
 Concerning Science (1949)
 The Alchemists, Founders of Modern Chemistry (1949)
 British Inventions (1950)
 Man and Matter - Essays Scientific & Christian (1951)
 The Alchemists (1952)
 Power Today and Tomorrow (1954)
 An Illustrated History of Science (1955)
 A History of Industrial Chemistry (Technology and Society) (1957)
 An Introduction To Alchemy

References 

1897 births
1956 deaths
Schoolteachers from London
People educated at Sherborne School
Alumni of Lincoln College, Oxford
Alumni of University College London
English chemists
English curators
Historians of science
Academic journal editors
Academics of Queen Mary University of London
Academics of the University of Oxford
Directors of museums in the United Kingdom
Directors of the Science Museum, London
20th-century English historians